Basile Mvé Engone (born 30 May 1941) is a Gabonese prelate of the Catholic Church. He was Archbishop of Libreville in Gabon from 1998 to 2020.

Biography
Mvé Engone was born in Nkolmelène, Gabon, in the Diocese of Oyem. He was ordained a priest on 29 June 1973 as a member of the Salesians of Saint John Bosco.

Episcopal career
Mvé Engone was appointed coadjutor bishop of Oyem on 24 August 1980. He received his episcopal consecration on 24 August from Bishop François Ndong, with Archbishop André Fernand Anguilé and Bishop Félicien-Patrice Makouaka as co-consecrators. Mvé Engone succeeded Ndong as bishop of Oyem on 23 August 1982. He was appointed Metropolitan Archbishop of Libreville on 3 April 1998.

On 27 June 2007, Mvé Engone, along with several other prelates, attended a briefing at the Apostolic Palace on Pope Benedict's impending motu proprio allowing wider celebration of the Tridentine Mass.

References

External links

1941 births
Living people
Gabonese Roman Catholic archbishops
20th-century Roman Catholic archbishops in Africa
21st-century Roman Catholic archbishops in Africa
People from Woleu-Ntem Province
Roman Catholic bishops of Oyem
Roman Catholic archbishops of Libreville
21st-century Gabonese people